Kosówka may refer to the following places:
Kosówka, Łódź Voivodeship (central Poland)
Kosówka, Podlaskie Voivodeship (north-east Poland)
Kosówka, Subcarpathian Voivodeship (south-east Poland)